Perichoresis is the debut studio album by Ishraqiyun and the eighth studio album by Secret Chiefs 3, released on October 21, 2014 by Web of Mimicry. The album comprises Afghani music influenced original compositions that utilize non-Western tunings and instrumentation that the band had previously performed in over forty countries. It is the second album in the band's discography to feature music entirely created by one of the satellite projects.

Reception
Critic Emmett Palaima gave Perichoresis a lukewarm reception, saying "the album has some interesting moments, usually electronic sounds, western melodies, or the occasional guitar solo such as on "Saptarshi", but these often only last for a bar or two before plunging back into a dull microtonal section."

Track listing

Personnel
Adapted from the Perichoresis liner notes.

Ishraqiyun
 Rich Doucette – Esraj (1, 2, 4), sārangī (1, 4)
 Timba Harris – violin (2, 3, 4)
 Danny Heifetz – right channel drums (1)
 Shahzad Ismaily – bass guitar (2)
 Eyvind Kang – viola (1, 2, 4)
 Ches Smith – drums (2, 3, 4, 5), congas (5)
 Trey Spruance – keyboards, production, recording, mastering, illustrations, design, bağlama (1, 2, 4), guitar (3, 5, 6), percussion (3, 5, 6), rabab (1, 2), lyre (1, 5), additional bass (2, 4), synthesizer (3, 5), harp (5), claves (5), celesta (6)

Additional musicians
 Mike Dillon – tabla (1, 2, 4)
 Justin Howell – sitar and tabla (6)
 Jai Young Kim – keyboards (1)
 Peijman Kouretchian – left channel drums (1)
 Matt Lebofsky – piano (3)
 Jason Schimmel – bass guitar (1)
 Danny Shamoun – ney (2)
 Adam Stacey – keyboards (2, 4)

Production and design
 Randall Dunn – recording (2, 3, 4)
 Justin Phelps – recording (6)
 Kurt Schlegel – recording (5)

Release history

References

External links 
 Perichoresis at iTunes
 

2014 albums
Secret Chiefs 3 albums
Web of Mimicry albums
Albums produced by Trey Spruance